Carol Ross Barney  (born 1949) is an American architect and the founder and Design Principal of Ross Barney Architects. She is the 2023 winner of the AIA Gold Medal. She became the first woman to design a federal building when commissioned as architect for the Oklahoma City Federal Building, which replaced the bombed Alfred P. Murrah Federal Building.  Ross Barney's other projects include the JRC Synagogue (LEED Platinum), James I Swenson Civil Engineering Building, (LEED Gold) the CTA Morgan Street Station, and the Chicago Riverwalk.

Biography 
Carol Ross Barney was born in Chicago, Illinois on April 12, 1949. She began her education in the Chicago Public Schools. In 1958, her father, an accountant and management consultant, was relocated to Düsseldorf in the British sector of West Germany. Returning to the Chicago area for high school, Carol was educated at the all-girls Catholic school, Regina Dominican, in Wilmette.  She enrolled in the Architecture program at the University of Illinois at Urbana Champaign receiving a Bachelor of Architecture degree in 1971. She returned and completed her Master's of Architecture in 1984.

Barney enlisted in the U.S. Peace Corps immediately after graduation and was assigned to Costa Rica where she worked for the fledgling Costa Rican National Park Service. Her projects included a master plan for coral reef protection and interpretation at Parque Nacional Cahuita, restoration of the historic hacienda at Parque Nacional Santa Rosa and worker housing at Parque Nacional Volcan Poas.

Following Peace Corps service, Barney joined Holabird and Root in Chicago and met her mentor, John A. Holabird, FAIA. The work there ranged from the 1979 AIA Institute Honor Award-winning restoration of the Chicago Public Library and Cultural Center to improvements for the Chicago Main Post Office.

In 1973, Carol was a founding member of Chicago Women in Architecture (CWA) and served as CWA's first president.  In 1988, while serving in the national AIA Women in Architecture Committee, she was advisor for two related AIA Exhibitions “That Exceptional One” and “Many More”, ground breaking explorations about women architects. CWA brought Barney together with Natalie deBlois, FAIA of Skidmore Owings and Merrill, who remained a close friend until Natalie's death in 2013.

In 1981, Barney started a solo practice in Chicago. Her college classmate, James Jankowski, FAIA, joined her from 1982-2005 and from 1984-2006 the firm was Ross Barney + Jankowski. Barney was awarded the 1983 Francis J. Plym Traveling Fellowship from the University of Illinois. The fellowship funded travel for research and allowed her to study the post war planning and rebuilding of European cities during 1983–84.

In 2001, construction began for the new Oklahoma City Federal Building, with Barney chosen as the lead designer for the replacement building for the Oklahoma City Federal Building following the terrorist bombing in 1995. The new Oklahoma City Federal Building had the design objective to create a space that was secure but open to reflect the United States democracy.

Barney has combined her own teaching with practice in 1976, when she taught at the University of Illinois Chicago.  Since 1994, she has been adjunct Professor of Architecture at the Illinois Institute of Technology where she teaches a popular advanced design studio and serves on the College of Architecture Board of Overseers.

Through her firm Ross Barney Architects, Carol has designed numerous projects for which she has received several accolades. In 2005, Carol was awarded the Thomas Jefferson Award from the AIA for her distinguished portfolio of public buildings.  One of her most recent projects, the expansion of the Chicago Riverwalk, received over seven different awards, including the 2017 Blue Ribbon Award – Friends of the Chicago River. For this project, along with her extensive accomplishments, Carol was awarded the AIA Chicago Lifetime Achievement Award in 2017.

Carol continues to oversee design projects through her firm, Ross Barney Architects. The scope of her work spans locally, regionally, and internationally with her buildings continued recognized for their dedication to innovation, sustainability, and overall improvement of the quality of life for those who live where her projects are located.

Awards and honors 
 2023 AIA Gold Medal
 2021 Cooper Hewitt, Smithsonian Design Museum National Design Award for Architecture and Interior Design 
 2021 Lincoln Academy of Illinois Order of Lincoln Award 
 2019 Fast Company Magazine The World's Most Innovative Companies; Architecture
 2019 Illinois Green Alliance Emerald Award for the McDonald's Chicago Flagship
 2019 Award for Excellence in Design, Leadership, and Service, Society of Architectural Historians
 2018 Honorary ASLA Member
2018 Metropolis (architecture magazine) Game Changer
 2017 AIA Chicago Lifetime Achievement Award
 2017 Chicago Magazine's Chicagoans of the Year
 2015 Vision Award; Smart Transit Solutions and Neighborhood Impact, Urban Land Institute Chicago,
 2013 AIA COTE Top Ten Green Project Award for Swenson Civil Engineering Building
 2013 AIA Divine Detail Award, Citation of Merit for Chicago Riverwalk - Underbridge Canopy Detail 
 2012 Chicago AIA Distinguished Building Award, Citation of Merit for CTA Morgan Station 
 2012 Evergreen Award for James I. Swenson Civil Engineering Building at the University of Minnesota, Duluth 
2012 American Architecture Awards for James I. Swenson Civil Engineering Building at the University of Minnesota, Duluth
 2011 AIA Distinguished Building Award, Honor Award for James I Swenson Civil Engineering Building 
 2011 AIA Distinguished Building Award, Citation of Merit for Fullerton and Belmont Stations Reconstruction 
 2009 AIA COTE Top Ten Green Project Award for Jewish Reconstructionist Congregation 
 2009 World Architecture Festival - Category Commendation for Jewish Reconstructionist Congregation Synagogue
 2002 AIA Institute Honor Award for Architecture for the Little Village Academy
 1999 AIA Institute Honor Award for Interior Architecture for the Little Village Academy
 1994 AIA Institute Honor Award for Architecture for the Cesar Chavez Elementary School
 1992 Federal Design Achievement Award through the Presidential Design Awards program, sponsored by the National Endowment for the Arts for the Glendale Heights Post Office 
 1991 AIA Institute Honor Award Achievement for the Glendale Heights Post Office

Carol is a Fellow of the American Institute of Architects. Her drawings have also been exhibited and collected by the Art Institute of Chicago, the Chicago Historical Society, The Museum of Contemporary Art Chicago and the National Building Museum. In addition, her oral history has been collected by the Art Institute of Chicago.

Selected works
O'Hare International Airport Multi-modal Terminal, Chicago, Illinois, 2019
Lincoln Park Zoo Visitor's Center, Chicago, Illinois, 2018 
McDonald's Chicago Flaghship, Chicago, Illinois, 2018
Chicago Riverwalk, Chicago, Illinois, 2016
Cermak-McCormick Place station, Chicago, Illinois, 2015
Fermilab, Office Technical and Education Building, Batavia, Illinois, 2014
Highland Park Elementary, Stillwater, Oklahoma, 2014
Will Rogers Elementary, Stillwater, Oklahoma, 2014
Ohio State University South Campus Central Chiller Plant, Columbus, Ohio, 2013
University of Chicago Child Development Center Drexel, Chicago, Illinois, 2013
CTA Morgan station, In conjunction with TranSystems, Chicago, Illinois, 2012
CTA Grand/State station, Chicago, Illinois, 2012
CTA Fullerton and Belmont Stations, Chicago, Illinois, 2012
James I. Swenson Civil Engineering Building, University of Minnesota Duluth, Duluth, Minnesota, 2010
Washington University Childcare Facility, St. Louis, Missouri, 2010
Jewish Reconstructionist Congregation Synagogue, Evanston, Illinois, 2008
Commodore John Barry Elementary School, Philadelphia, Pennsylvania, 2008
Champaign Public Library, Champaign, Illinois, 2008
Mitzi Freidheim Child Family Center, Chicago, Illinois, 2007
College of Dupage Early Childhood Education and Care Facility, Glen Ellyn, Illinois, 2007
Oakton Community College Art, Science, and Technology Building, Skokie, Illinois, 2006
New Oklahoma City Federal Building, Oklahoma City, Oklahoma, 2005
Glenside Public Library, Glenside Heights, Illinois, 2003
Governors State University Family Development Center, University Park, Illinois, 2003
Governors State University Faculty Office Building, University Park, Illinois, 2003
Levy Senior Center, Evanston, Illinois, 2002
Little Village Academic Resource Center, Chicago, Illinois, 2001
Carole Robertson Center for Learning, Chicago, Illinois, 2002
Little Village Academy, Chicago, Illinois, 1996
Cesar Chavez Multicultural Academic Center, Chicago, Illinois, 1993

Gallery

References

External links 
Ross Barney Architects - Official Website
Carol Ross Barney Biography
Convocation Speaker at 2007 UIUC School of Architecture Convocation Ceremony on May 13
Regina Dominican's Distinguished Alumnae

1949 births
Living people
Architects from Chicago
American women architects
Fellows of the American Institute of Architects
20th-century American architects
21st-century American architects
University of Illinois School of Architecture alumni
20th-century American women
21st-century American women